is an EP by Japanese singer Yōko Oginome. Released through Victor Entertainment on August 5, 1986, the EP served as the soundtrack to the TBS drama series , which starred Oginome as the lead character . It was reissued on March 24, 2010 with nine bonus tracks as part of Oginome's 25th anniversary celebration.

The EP peaked at No. 4 on Oricon's albums chart and sold over 42,000 copies.

Track listing

Charts

References

External links
 
 
 

1986 albums
Yōko Oginome albums
Japanese-language albums
Victor Entertainment EPs